Pancrase is a Japanese mixed martial arts (MMA) promotion company based in Tokyo. It was founded in 1993 by professional wrestlers Masakatsu Funaki and Minoru Suzuki.

The name was based on pankration, a fighting sport in the Ancient Olympic Games. Suzuki and Funaki practiced catch wrestling. They based the promotion and its rules on professional wrestling. The promotion's champions were called "King of Pancrase".

The rules allowed closed-fisted punches, except to the head, and palm strikes to the head. A wrestler must break a submission hold when the opponent reaches the ropes, but a wrestler who claims a rope break loses a point. A wrestler who claims a specified number of rope breaks (between 3 and 5) was disqualified. From 1998 to 2000, the promotion changed its rules to resemble other mixed martial arts promotions.

Pancrase participant Guy Mezger said that "there was [sic] not very many works [predetermined outcomes]. Maybe 4 or 5 total and most of them were before I was fighting for them. I hate when people say that there was [sic] so many works in Pancrase, they truly do not know what they are talking about".[1]

Beginning in 2007, Pancrase: Legends of Mixed Martial Arts aired weekly on ImaginAsian TV. The network folded in 2011.

In 2008, the Fight Network began airing Pancrase events in Canada and the United Kingdom.

History

Establishment and first event
In 1993, Masakatsu Funaki, Minoru Suzuki, Ken Shamrock, Takaku Fuke, and others from the shoot-style Fujiwara Gumi wrestling promotion left the company, due to (mentor and promoter) Yoshiaki Fujiwara's decision to cooperate with the likes of Universal Lucha Libre and W*ING and favoring showmanship over in-ring work. As suggested by Karl Gotch, Pancrase was formed by Funaki, Suzuki and Fuke, and the promotion would focus on pure shoot-style wrestling with limited gimmicks and no predetermined outcomes.

Funaki and Suzuki were students of wrestler Antonio Inoki. They were inspired by the 1976 Muhammad Ali vs. Antonio Inoki event that pit a boxer against a wrestler.

On May 16, 1993, they established World Pancrase Create Inc. (WPC) with the capital of 30,000,000 Japanese yen.

On September 21, 1993, Pancrase promoted their first event at Tokyo Bay NK Hall. All the matches were finished with knockout and submission.

Early era
The first King Of Pancrase Open Weight champion was Ken Shamrock (later becoming famous for his exploits in the Ultimate Fighting Championship), who had previous experience in the newborn UWF and Fujiwara Gumi. Over the years, Funaki and Suzuki held the title alongside other big names, such as Bas Rutten, Frank Shamrock and Guy Mezger.

Pancrase now recognizes King of Pancrase titles in the super heavyweight, heavyweight, light heavyweight, middleweight and welterweight divisions, and there are plans to award new lightweight and featherweight champions in the future. The open weight title was recently restored and is currently held by Josh Barnett, who formerly competed in PRIDE and the Ultimate Fighting Championship. Minoru Suzuki no longer competes for Pancrase, as he returned to regular professional wrestling in 2003 as a freelancer, but he primarily competes in New Japan Pro-Wrestling.

Founding of Pancrase Korea
Pancrase Korea is the South Korean subsidiary of the Pancrase Inc. and held several events from 2007 to 2010. The first Pancrase Korea event was an amateur one held on March 10, 2007, in Busan and the last one was the semi-professional Neo-Blood Tournament 2 & Hybrid Challenge 12 held on September 12, 2010, in Seoul.

Changes in management
In May 2008, "Pancrase Inc." was established as a new management company for Pancrase, and WPC alienated Pancrase Inc. their all of business as on May 27, 2008. When Pancrase Inc. was established, Yasushi Sakamoto, a managing director of WPC, was installed as the executive president.

On October 14, 2008, Pancrase Inc. moved its office to Nishi Ikebukuro in the ward of Toshima in Tokyo.

In September 2009, Pancrase Inc. moved its office from Nishi Ikebukuro to Aobadai in ward of Meguro in Tokyo, and moved again to Kameido in the ward of Koto.

On October 1, 2010, Ryo Kawamura, who was the current mixed martial artist was installed as the executive president. Yasushi Sakamoto, the former president, had become a managing director.

Kawamura held a press conference in Yokohama, Kanagawa, on October 22, and explained about restructuring and announced that "Commission Council" had been established as a third party
.

On June 1, 2012, Pancrase announced that the promotion had been sold to Masakazu Sakai and his Smash organization, with Sakai taking over as the new president and his partner Yuji Shimada as the event producer of the promotion. As part of the reconstruction of Pancrase, the new owners intend to replace rings with cages, holding events to test the new format in 2013.

Pancrase 257 on March 30, 2014, was the last event where Pancrase used a ring, and by Pancrase 258 on May 11, 2014, Pancrase adopted the decagon or the ten-sided cage of their American partners World Series of Fighting.

Organizational change
On March 9, 2022, the Smash Martial Arts Department Pancrase Business Headquarters will be reorganized and operated as the "Pancrase Executive Committee".

In addition, the King of Pancrase Executive Committee will also be reorganized and operated as the "King of Pancrase Council".

Rules

Original rules
Aside from the traditional grappling rules (e.g., no biting, no eye-gouging) the rules were formerly as follows:
 No elbows to the head (neither while standing nor on the ground).
 No closed-fist strikes to the head (neither while standing nor on the ground).
 No knees to the head on the ground.
 No kicks/stomps to the head on the ground.
 If a participant gets too close to the ropes, he is stood back up on the feet. (as opposed to PRIDE's re-centering in the middle of the ring)
 Non-title matches consist of one 15 minute round, while title matches consist of one 30 minute round.
 If a participant is caught in a submission and taps out (whether unable to reach the ropes or not), it is a loss.
 Five "escapes" are given to each fighter at the start of every match. An escape can be used when caught in a submission near the ropes, in which case the participant can grab them, be stood back on the feet and have one point deducted. Once a participant has used all of his escapes, it is a loss.
 For knockouts, a ten-count similar to boxing and kickboxing is used. If the participant is unable to answer the ten-count, it is declared a TKO and that fighter has lost the match. However, if the participant is able to answer the ten-count, the fight resumes and one point is deducted.
 If, at the end of regulated time, neither fighter has submitted, been knocked out, or lost all their points, a decision is rendered based on who lost fewer points. If neither fighter lost any points, or both lost the same number of points, the fight is declared a draw.
 In the 1994 King of Pancrase tournament, the rules were slightly different, in that the first round had one 10-minute round and three rope escapes, and the finals had one 20-minute round with three rope escapes.
 For a short period of time when Bas Rutten was the King of Pancrase, heelhooks were banned because of the frequency of injuries.
 Strikes on the ground – whether closed fist to the body or open hand to the head – were discouraged by the fans, but still legal.

Present-day Japanese rules
After Pancrase: Breakthrough 1 held on January 19, 1999, Pancrase began to use a ruleset similar to that of Pride FC, but prohibits knees to the head of grounded opponents.

In May 2016, Pancrase adopted the Association of Boxing Commissions and Combative Sports rules, better known as the Unified Rules of Mixed Martial Arts.

Weight classes

Current Pancrase champions (King and Queen of Pancrase)

The current weight division system of Pancrase is based upon the Unified Rules of Mixed Martial Arts since December 4, 2007. At this time, Pancrase also announced establishment of Flyweight and Bantamweight, and abolition of Super heavyweight. On March 18, 2011, Pancrase restructured their weight classes adding several more lower weight classes. In addition, they introduced the Queen Of Pancrase title which will be used for women's fights in the future.

Former Pancrase champions
	
 Ken Shamrock
 Masakatsu Funaki
 Bas Rutten
 Minoru Suzuki
 Sanae Kikuta
 Kiuma Kunioku
 Tsuyoshi Kosaka
 Frank Shamrock
 Yuki Kondo
 Nathan Marquardt
 Ricardo Almeida
 Josh Barnett
 Semmy Schilt
 Guy Mezger
 Katsuya Inoue
 Maximo Blanco
 Mitsuhisa Sunabe
 Izuru Takeuchi

Notable alumni

 Bas Rutten 
 Chael Sonnen
 Ken Shamrock
 Frank Shamrock
 Carlos Condit
 José Aldo
 Nate Diaz
 Josh Barnett
 Guy Mezger
 Minoru Suzuki
 Akihiro Gono
 Jason Delucia
 Genki Sudo
 Ikuhisa Minowa
 Evangelista Santos
 Ryushi Yanagisawa
 Manabu Yamada
 Yoshiki Takahashi
 Ryo Kawamura
 Riki Fukuda
 Paul Daley
 Satoru Kitaoka
 Masayuki Kono
 Daiki Hata
 Izuru Takeuchi
 Yukio Sakaguchi
 Joe Riggs
 Chris Lytle
 Kazuo Misaki
 Evan Tanner
 Maurice Smith

See also 

 List of Pancrase events
 Pankration, an ancient Greek martial art

References

External links 
 Pancrase Website 
 Pancrase event results at sherdog
 Wrestling-Titles.com: Pancrase

Hybrid martial arts
Japanese professional wrestling promotions
Mixed martial arts organizations